AN Ursae Majoris is a binary star system in the northern circumpolar constellation of Ursa Major. It is a variable star, with AN Ursae Majoris being the variable star designation, and ranges in brightness from 14.90 down to 20.2. Even at its peak brightness though, the system is much too faint to be visible to the naked eye. Based on parallax measurements, the system is located roughly 1,050 light years away from the Sun.

The pair form an eclipsing binary system that decreases from magnitude 14.9 down to 20.2, once per orbit. This object, along with AM Herculis, define a class of cataclysmic variables known as polars. The pair consist of a low mass white dwarf with a strong magnetic field, interacting with a low–mass main sequence star that has filled its Roche lobe. Matter is being energetically accreted from the main sequence star onto one or both magnetic poles of the white dwarf star, producing emission lines in the spectrum.

References

White dwarfs
Polars (cataclysmic variable stars)
Eclipsing binaries

Ursa Major (constellation)
Ursae Majoris, AN